Teenage Warning is Angelic Upstarts' first album, released in August 1979. It peaked at No. 29 in the UK Albums Chart and featured three singles, (a re-recording of) "The Murder of Liddle Towers", "I'm An Upstart" and "Teenage Warning". If you take into account that the B-sides "The Young Ones" and "Leave Me Alone" are also included, then almost half the album was also available on 7" singles.

The band were initially signed to Jimmy Pursey (Sham 69)'s JP Productions. The plan was to record a demo and use Pursey's leverage to secure a deal with Polydor - this floundered following an incident involving Pursey, a security guard and a snowball fight. Warner Brothers stepped in and signed them.

The album sleeve depicts a tattooed orange with a clockwork key, symbolising the Anthony Burgess book and Stanley Kubrick film A Clockwork Orange and taken from the opening lyric of the title track, "Wind me up like a clockwork orange".

Bert Martens at the NME reviewed the album suggesting it would be Angelic Upstarts' "one burst" before they disintegrated, and remarked it was not his greatest listening experience but he had great fun reviewing it.

Track listing
All songs written by Thomas Mensforth and Ray Cowie, except as shown.

Side A
"Teenage Warning" - 3.02
"Student Power" - 2.21
"The Young Ones" (Sid Tepper, Roy C. Bennett) - 1.49
"Never Again" - 3.06
"We Are The People" - 3.57
"The Murder of Liddle Towers" - 4.41

Side B
"I'm An Upstart" - 2.21
"Small Town Small Mind" - 2.26
"Youth Leader" - 3.05
"Do Anything" - 2.17
"Let's Speed" - 2.34
"Leave Me Alone" - 2.16
Bonus tracks
"The Murder of Liddle Towers" (single version)
"Police Oppression" (single version)

Personnel
Angelic Upstarts
Thomas "Mensi" Mensforth - vocals
Raymond "Mond" Cowie - guitar
Steve Forsten - bass
Keith "Sticks" Warrington - drums on tracks 1-12
Derek "Decca" Wade - drums on bonus tracks

References

1979 debut albums
Angelic Upstarts albums
Warner Records albums